The Zhuangzi (Chinese: , historically romanized Chuang Tzŭ) is an ancient Chinese text from the late Warring States period (476221) which contains stories and anecdotes that exemplify the carefree nature of the ideal Taoist sage.  Named for its traditional author, "Master Zhuang" (Zhuangzi), the Zhuangzi is one of the two foundational texts of Taoism, along with the Tao Te Ching.

The Zhuangzi consists of a large collection of anecdotes, allegories, parables, and fables, which are often humorous or irreverent.  Its main themes are of spontaneity in action and of freedom from the human world and its conventions. The fables and anecdotes in the text attempt to illustrate the falseness of human distinctions between good and bad, large and small, life and death, and human and nature. While other ancient Chinese philosophers focused on moral and personal duty, Zhuangzi promoted carefree wandering and becoming one with "the Way" (Dào ) by following nature.

Though primarily known as a philosophical work, the Zhuangzi is regarded as one of the greatest literary works in Chinese history, and has been called "the most important pre-Qin text for the study of Chinese literature". A masterpiece of both philosophical and literary skill, it has significantly influenced major Chinese writers and poets for more than 2000 years from the Han dynasty (206AD220) to the present.

History

Authorship and textual history
The Zhuangzi is named for and attributed to a man named Zhuang Zhou, who is customarily called "Zhuangzi" ("Master Zhuang", from Mandarin Chinese  ). Nothing is concretely known of Zhuangzi's life.  He is generally said to have been born around 369 at a place called Meng in the state of Song (around present-day Shangqiu, Henan Province), and to have died around 301, 295, or 286. He is thought to have spent time in the southern state of Chu, as well as in Linzi, the capital of the state of Qi. Sima Qian's 1st century BC Records of the Grand Historian, the first of China's 24 dynastic histories, has a biography of Zhuangzi, but most of it seems to have simply been drawn from anecdotes in the Zhuangzi itself. In the introduction to his Zhuangzi translation, the American scholar Burton Watson concluded: "Whoever Zhuang Zhou was, the writings attributed to him bear the stamp of a brilliant and original mind."

The first seven chapters of the Zhuangzi, which are known as the "inner chapters", were historically considered the actual work of Zhuangzi, and most modern scholars agree with this view. The remaining 26 chapters are known as the "outer chapters" and "miscellaneous chapters". Whether these chapters were written by Zhuangzi has long been debated. Chinese scholars recognized as early as the Song dynasty (9601279) that some parts of the book could not have been written by Zhuangzi himself. Today, it is generally accepted that the middle and later Zhuangzi chapters are the result of a process of "accretion and redaction" by other authors "responding to the scintillating brilliance" of the inner chapters. Despite the uncertainty over the later chapters' authorship, scholars accept all of the Zhuangzi 33 surviving chapters as compositions dating from the 4th to 2nd centuries BC.

Details of the Zhuangzis textual history prior to the Han dynasty (206AD220) are largely unknown.  Traces of its influence in late Warring States period philosophical texts such as the Guanzi, Han Feizi, Huainanzi, and Lüshi Chunqiu suggest that Zhuangzi's intellectual lineage was already fairly influential in the states of Qi and Chu in the 3rd century. In Records of the Grand Historian, Sima Qian refers to a 100,000-word Zhuangzi work and references several chapters that are still in the text.  The Book of Han, finished in AD 111, lists a Zhuangzi in 52 chapters, which many scholars believe to be the original form of the work. Several different versions of the Zhuangzi survived into the Tang dynasty (618907), but a shorter and more popular 33-chapter form of the book prepared by the philosopher and writer Guo Xiang around AD 300 is the source of all surviving editions. 

In 742, an imperial proclamation from Emperor Xuanzong of Tang canonized the Zhuangzi as one of the Chinese classics  and awarded it the honorific title True Scripture of Southern Florescence. Nevertheless, most Chinese scholars did not consider the Zhuangzi to be a true "classic" due to its non-Confucian nature.

Manuscripts

Portions of the Zhuangzi have been discovered among bamboo slip texts from Warring States period and Han dynasty tombs, particularly at the Shuanggudui and Zhangjiashan Han bamboo texts sites.  One of the slips from the Guodian bamboo texts, which date to around 300 BC, contains what appears to be a short fragment from the "Ransacking Coffers" ("Qū qiè" ) chapter.

Many Zhuangzi fragments dating from the early Tang dynasty were discovered among the Dunhuang manuscripts in the early 20th century by the expeditions of Hungarian-British explorer Aurel Stein and French Sinologist Paul Pelliot. They collectively form about twelve chapters of Guo Xiang's version of the Zhuangzi, and are preserved mostly at the British Library and the Bibliothèque nationale de France.

Among the Japanese national treasures preserved in the Kōzan-ji temple in Kyoto is a Zhuangzi manuscript from the Muromachi period (13381573). The manuscript has seven complete chapters from the "outer" and "miscellaneous" chapters, and is believed to be a close copy of an annotated edition written in the 7th century by the Chinese Daoist master Cheng Xuanying.

Content

The Zhuangzi consists of a large collection of anecdotes, allegories, "goblet words", parables, and fables which are often humorous or irreverent in nature. Most Zhuangzi stories are fairly short and simple, such as "Lickety" and "Split" drilling seven holes in "Wonton" (chapter 7) or Zhuangzi being discovered sitting and drumming on a basin after his wife dies (chapter 18), although a few are longer and more complex, like the story of Master Lie and the magus (chapter 14) and the account of the Yellow Emperor's music (chapter 14). Unlike the other stories and allegories in other pre-Qin texts, the Zhuangzi is unique in that the allegories form the bulk of the text, rather than occasional features, and are always witty, emotional, and are not limited to reality.

Unlike other ancient Chinese works, whose allegories were usually based on historical legends and proverbs, most Zhuangzi stories seem to have been invented by Zhuangzi himself.  Some are completely whimsical, such as the strange description of evolution from "misty spray" through a series of substances and insects to horses and humans (chapter 18), while a few other passages seem to be "sheer playful nonsense" which read like Lewis Carroll's "Jabberwocky". The Zhuangzi is full of quirky and fantastic characters, such as "Mad Stammerer", "Fancypants Scholar", "Sir Plow", and a man who fancies that his left arm will turn into a rooster, his right arm will turn into a crossbow, and his buttocks will become cartwheels.

A master of language, Zhuangzi sometimes engages in logic and reasoning, but then turns it upside down or carries the arguments to absurdity to demonstrate the limitations of human knowledge and the rational world. Sinologist Victor Mair compares Zhuangzi's reasoning, such as his argument with his philosopher friend Huizi (Master Hui) about the joy of fish (chapter 17), to the Socratic dialogue tradition, and terms Huizi's paradoxes near the end of the book "strikingly like those of Zeno of Elea".

Notable passages

"The Butterfly Dream"

The most famous of all Zhuangzi stories—"Zhuang Zhou Dreams of Being a Butterfly"—appears at the end of the second chapter, "On the Equality of Things".

The image of Zhuangzi wondering if he was a man who dreamed of being a butterfly or a butterfly dreaming of being a man became so well-known that whole dramas have been written on its theme.  In the passage, Zhuangzi "[plays] with the theme of transformation", illustrating that "the distinction between waking and dreaming is another false dichotomy. If [one] distinguishes them, how can [one] tell if [one] is now dreaming or awake?"

"The Death of Wonton"
Another well known Zhuangzi story"The Death of Wonton"illustrates the dangers Zhuangzi saw in going against the innate nature of things.

Zhuangzi believed that the greatest of all human happiness could be achieved through a higher understanding of the nature of things, and that in order to develop oneself fully one needed to express one's innate ability. In this anecdote, Zhuangzi humorously and absurdly uses "Wonton"a name for the Chinese conception of primordial chaos that later lent its name to wonton soupto demonstrate what he believed were the disastrous consequences of going against things' innate natures.

"The Debate on the Joy of Fish"
The story of "The Debate on the Joy of Fish" is a well-known anecdote that has been compared to the Socratic dialogue tradition of ancient Greece.

The exact point made by Zhuangzi in this debate is not entirely clear.  The story seems to make the point that "knowing" a thing is simply a state of mind, and that it is not possible to determine if that "knowing" has any objective validity.  This story has been cited as an example of Zhuangzi's linguistic mastery, as he subtly uses reason to make an anti-rationalist point.

"Drumming On a Tub and Singing"
Another well-known Zhuangzi story—"Drumming On a Tub and Singing"—describes how Zhuangzi did not view death as something to be feared.

Zhuangzi seems to have viewed death as a natural process or transformation, where one gives up one form of existence and assumes another. In the second chapter, he makes the point that, for all humans know, death may in fact be better than life: "How do I know that loving life is not a delusion? How do I know that in hating death I am not like a man who, having left home in his youth, has forgotten the way back?" His writings teach that "the wise man or woman accepts death with equanimity and thereby achieves absolute happiness."

Zhuangzi's death
The story of Zhuangzi's death, contained in chapter 32 of the text, exemplifies the colorful lore that grew up around Zhuangzi in the decades after his death, as well as the elaboration of the core philosophical ideas contained in the "inner chapters" that appears in the "outer" and "miscellaneous chapters".

List of chapters

Themes

The stories and anecdotes of the Zhuangzi embody a unique set of principles and attitudes, including living one's life with natural spontaneity, uniting one's inner self with the cosmic "Way" (Dao), keeping oneself distant from politics and social obligations, accepting death as a natural transformation, showing appreciation and praise for things others view as useless or aimless, and stridently rejecting social values and conventional reasoning.  These principles form the core ideas of philosophical Daoism.  The other major philosophical schools of ancient Chinasuch as Confucianism, Legalism, and Mohismwere all concerned with concrete social, political, or ethical reforms designed to reform people and society and thereby alleviate the problems and suffering of the world. Zhuangzi believed that the key to true happiness was to free oneself from the world and its standards through the Daoist principle of  "inaction" (wúwéi )action that is not based on any purposeful striving or motives for gainand was fundamentally opposed to systems that impose order on individuals.

The Zhuangzi interprets the universe as a thing that changes spontaneously without a conscious God or will driving it, and argues that humans can achieve ultimate happiness by living equally spontaneously. It argues that because of humans' advanced cognitive abilities, they have a tendency to create artificial distinctionssuch as good versus bad, large versus small, usefulness versus uselessness, and social systems like Confucianismthat remove themselves from the natural spontaneity of the universe. To illustrate the mindlessness and spontaneity he felt should characterize human action, Zhuangzi most often uses the analogy of craftsmen or artisans. As Burton Watson described, "the skilled woodcarver, the skilled butcher, the skilled swimmer does not ponder or ratiocinate on the course of action he should take; his skill has become so much a part of him that he merely acts instinctively and spontaneously and, without knowing why, achieves success." The term "wandering" (yóu) is used throughout the stories of the Zhuangzi to describe how an enlightened person "wanders through all of creation, enjoying its delights without ever becoming attached to any one part of it."

The Zhuangzi vigorously opposes formal government, which Zhuangzi seems to have felt was problematic at its foundation "because of the opposition between man and nature." The text tries to show that "as soon as government intervenes in natural affairs, it destroys all possibility of genuine happiness." It is unclear if Zhuangzi's positions amounted to a form of anarchism, as the political references in the Zhuangzi are more concerned with what government should not do, rather than what kind of government should exist.

Western scholars have long noticed that the Zhuangzi is often strongly anti-rationalist. Whereas reason and logic became the hallmark of Ancient Greek philosophy and then the entire Western philosophical tradition, Chinese philosophers preferred to rely on moral persuasion and intuition. The Zhuangzi played a significant role in the traditional Chinese skepticism toward rationalism, as Zhuangzi frequently turns logical arguments upside-down to satirize and discredit them. Zhuangzi did not entirely abandon language and reason, but "only wished to point out that overdependence on them could limit the flexibility of thought."

Influence
The Zhuangzi is the most influential purely literary Chinese work dating from before China's imperial unification in 221. Its literary quality, imagination and creativity, and linguistic prowess were unprecedented in the period of its creation. Virtually every major Chinese writer or poet in history, from Sima Xiangru and Sima Qian during the Han dynasty, Ruan Ji and Tao Yuanming during the Six Dynasties, Li Bai during the Tang dynasty, to Su Shi and Lu You in the Song dynasty were "deeply imbued with the ideas and artistry of the Zhuangzi."

Early times
Traces of the Zhuangzis influence in late Warring States period philosophical texts such as the Guanzi, Han Feizi, Huainanzi, and Lüshi Chunqiu suggest that Zhuangzi's intellectual lineage was already fairly influential in the states of Qi and Chu in the 3rd century.  During the Qin and Han dynastieswith their state-sponsored Legalist and Confucian ideologies, respectivelythe Zhuangzi does not seem to have been highly regarded.   One exception is Han dynasty scholar Jia Yi's 170 work "Fu on the Owl" (Fúniǎo fù ), the earliest definitively known fu rhapsody, which does not reference the Zhuangzi by name but cites it for one-sixth of the poem.

After the collapse of the Han dynasty in AD 207 and the subsequent chaos of the Three Kingdoms period, both the Zhuangzi and Zhuang Zhou began to rise in popularity and acclaim.  The 3rd century AD poets Ruan Ji and Xi Kang, both members of the Seven Sages of the Bamboo Grove, were ardent Zhuangzi admirers, and one of Ruan's essays, entitled "Discourse on Summing Up the Zhuangzi" (Dá Zhuāng lùn ), is still extant.  This period saw Confucianism temporarily surpassed by a revival of Daoism and old divination texts, such as the Classic of Changes (I Ching ), and many early medieval Chinese poets, artists, and calligraphers were deeply influenced by the Zhuangzi.

Daoism and Buddhism
The Zhuangzi has been called "the most important of all the Daoist writings", and its "inner chapters" embody the core ideas of philosophical Daoism. In the 4th century AD, the Zhuangzi became a major source of imagery and terminology for a new form of Daoism known as the "Highest Clarity" (Shangqing ) school that was popular among the aristocracy of the Jin dynasty (266–420).  Highest Clarity Daoism borrowed notable Zhuangzi terms, such as "perfected man" (zhēn rén ), "Great Clarity" (Tài Qīng ), and "fasting the mind" (xīn zhāi ), and although they are used somewhat differently than in the Zhuangzi itself, they still show the important role the Zhuangzi played at the time.

The Zhuangzi was very influential in the adaptation of Buddhism to Chinese culture after Buddhism was first brought to China from India in the 1st century AD. Zhi Dun, China's first aristocratic Buddhist monk, wrote a prominent commentary to the Zhuangzi in the mid-4th century.  The Zhuangzi also played a significant role in the formation of Chan ("Zen") Buddhism, which grew out of "a fusion of Buddhist ideology and ancient Daoist thought."  Among the traits Chan/Zen Buddhism borrowed from the Zhuangzi are a distrust of language and logic, an insistence that "the Dao" can be found in everything, even dung and urine, and a fondness for dialogues based on riddles or paradigm-challenging statements known as gōng'àn (Japanese kōan).

Medieval and early modern
The Zhuangzi retained prominence throughout Chinese history as the preeminent example of core Daoist philosophical ideals.  The 17th century scholar Gu Yanwu lamented his government's flippant use of the Zhuangzi on the imperial examination essays as representative of a decline in traditional morals at the end of the Ming dynasty (1368–1644).  In the great Chinese novel Dream of the Red Chamber (Hong lou meng ), the main protagonist, Jia Baoyu, often turns to the Zhuangzi for comfort amidst his despair over conflicting love interests and relationships.  The story of Zhuangzi drumming on a tub and singing after the death of his wife inspired an entire tradition of folk music called "funeral drumming" (sàng-gǔ ) in central China's Hubei and Hunan Provinces that survived into the 18th and 19th centuries.

Modern
Outside of China and the traditional "Sinosphere", the Zhuangzi lags far behind the Tao Te Ching in general popularity, and is rarely known by non-scholars. A number of prominent scholars have attempted to bring the Zhuangzi to wider attention among Western readers.  In 1939, the British translator and Sinologist Arthur Waley described the Zhuangzi as "one of the most entertaining as well as one of the profoundest books in the world."  In the introduction to his 1994 translation of the Zhuangzi, the American Sinologist Victor H. Mair wrote: "I feel a sense of injustice that the Dao De Jing is so well known to my fellow citizens while the Zhuangzi is so thoroughly ignored, because I firmly believe that the latter is in every respect a superior work."

Selected translations 
 Herbert Giles (1889), Chuang Tzŭ:  Mystic, Moralist and Social Reformer, London: Bernard Quaritch; 2nd edition, revised (1926), Shanghai: Kelly and Walsh; reprinted (1961), London: George Allen and Unwin.
 James Legge (1891), The Texts of Taoism, in Sacred Books of the East, vols. XXXIX, XL, Oxford: Oxford University Press.
 Fung Yu-lan (1933), Chuang Tzu, a New Selected Translation with an Exposition on the Philosophy of Kuo Hsiang, Shanghai: Shang wu.
 Burton Watson (1964), Chuang tzu: Basic Writings, New York: Columbia University Press; 2nd edition (1996); 3rd edition (2003) converted to pinyin.
  Mitsuji Fukunaga  (1966),  Sōshi  [Zhuangzi], 3 vols., Tokyo: Asahi.
 Burton Watson (1968), The Complete Works of Chuang Tzu, New York: Columbia University Press.
  Liou Kia-hway  (1969), L'œuvre complète de Tchouang-tseu [The Complete Works of Zhuangzi], Paris: Gallimard.
  Kiyoshi Akatsuka  (1977), Sōshi  [Zhuangzi], in Zenshaku kanbun taikei  [Fully Interpreted Chinese Literature Series], vols. 16-17, Tokyo: Shūeisha.
 A. C. Graham (1981), Chuang-tzu, The Seven Inner Chapters and Other Writings from the Book Chuang-tzu, London: George Allen and Unwin.  Translation notes published separately in 1982 as Chuang-tzu: Textual Notes to a Partial Translation, London: School of Oriental and African Studies.
 Victor H. Mair (1994), Wandering on the Way: Early Taoist Tales and Parables of Chuang Tzu, New York: Bantam Books; republished (1997), Honolulu: University of Hawaii Press.
 Philip J. Ivanhoe, Bryan W. Van Norden (eds.) (2001) Readings in Classical Chinese Philosophy (Second Edition), Chapter 5, translated by Paul Kjellberg, Indianapolis: Hackett Publishing.
 Brook Ziporyn (2009), Zhuangzi: The Essential Writings with Selections from Traditional Commentaries, Indianapolis: Hackett Publishing.
 Brook Ziporyn (2020), Zhuangzi: The Complete Writings, Indianapolis: Hackett Publishing.
 Richard John Lynn (2022), Zhuangzi: A New Translation of the Daoist Classic as Interpreted by Guo Xiang, New York: Columbia University Press.
 Christopher Tricker (2022), The cicada and the bird. The usefulness of a useless philosophy. Chuang Tzu's ancient wisdom translated for modern life.

See also 

 Tao Te Ching
 Liezi
 Wenzi
 Four Books

References

Notes

Citations

Works cited

 
 
 
 
 
 
 
  (Google Books)
  (Google Books)

External links
 
 Zhuangzi Bilingual Chinese-English version (James Legge translation)
 Selection from The Zhuangzi, translated by Patricia Ebrey
 The Complete Works Of Chuang Tzu, translated by Burton Watson, archived from the original on 1 January 2004
 Zhuangzi: The Inner Chapters, translated by Robert Eno

Taoist texts
Ancient Chinese philosophical literature
Philosophy books
Zhou dynasty texts
3rd-century BC books